Queenstown Constituency was a constituency in Singapore. It used to exist from 1955 to 1988, where it was absorbed into Brickworks GRC.

Member of Parliament

Elections

Elections in 1950s

Elections in 1960s

Historical maps

References 

Singaporean electoral divisions
Queenstown, Singapore